Cristian Alberto Oviedo Calvo (born 25 August 1978) is a retired Costa Rican football player.

Club career
He usually played as a defensive midfielder, but also an attacking midfielder due his passing skills and vision.

He made his debut in the Primera División on December 3, 1997 playing for Carmelita against Alajuelense. Oviedo scored the winning penalty kick in the 2010 Invierno final, helping Alajuela win its 26th league championship.

He retired on 26 July 2014 after 17 years in the Premier Division, totalling 495 league matches and 41 goals.

International career
Oviedo made his debut for Costa Rica in a January 2009 UNCAF Nations Cup match against Panama and earned a total of 11 caps, scoring no goals. He represented his country in 3 FIFA World Cup qualification matches and played at the 2009 UNCAF Nations Cup as well as at the 2009 CONCACAF Gold Cup. He also was a non-playing squad member at the 2004 Copa América.

His final international was a September 2009 FIFA World Cup qualification match against El Salvador.

References

External links

1978 births
Living people
People from Alajuela
Association football midfielders
Costa Rican footballers
Costa Rica international footballers
2001 UNCAF Nations Cup players
2004 Copa América players
2009 UNCAF Nations Cup players
2009 CONCACAF Gold Cup players
A.D. Carmelita footballers
C.S. Herediano footballers
Santos de Guápiles footballers
L.D. Alajuelense footballers
Liga FPD players